Hum Hai Jodi No 1 is a 2016 Bhojpuri-language romantic action comedy film directed by Dilip Gulati. It stars Ravi Kishan, Rani Chatterjee And Poonam Dubey. This film is a remake of the 2010 Telugu film Brindavanam.

Plot
Raja's girlfriend asks him to help Shivani by pretending to be Shivani's boyfriend. But he realises that he will have to put more effort to Shivani's feuding family members.

Cast
Ravi Kishan as Raja
Rani Chatterjee as Shivani
Poonam Dubey as Raja's girlfriend
Aanara Gupta
Dinesh Tiwari
Upendra Chowdhury
Bhawana Singh Chauhan
Sardarad Singh
Purendra Giri

Production
The film was mainly shot in Bihar and Jharkhand.

Music

Release
The film was released in theatres on 29 July 2016.

References 

2016 films
Bhojpuri remakes of Telugu films
2010s Bhojpuri-language films
Films released on YouTube